The 2022 season was the New York Jets' 53rd in the National Football League (NFL), their 63rd overall, their fourth under general manager Joe Douglas and their second under head coach Robert Saleh. 

The team raced out to a strong start, and with a Week 7 victory over the Denver Broncos, they improved on their 4–13 record from 2021. However despite starting 7–4 on the year, the Jets suffered a late-season collapse. Their playoff hopes were dashed as they fell into a brutal six-game losing streak, while also failing to score a touchdown in their final three games, and were eliminated from playoff contention after a Week 17 loss to the Seattle Seahawks. A loss to the Miami Dolphins the following week led to the Jets finishing with a 7–10 record, which clinched New York's third consecutive season with double-digit losses. It was also the twelfth straight year the Jets did not qualify for the postseason, breaking the franchise record set from 1970–1980, as well as extending the longest active postseason drought in the NFL. They also finished below .500 for the seventh consecutive season. 

Despite poor offensive performances led by quarterback Zach Wilson and scoring less than 7 points in each of their final three games of the season, the defense made major improvements, ranking fourth in defense in terms of both scoring and yardage, allowing a total of only 316 points and total of 5,288 yards (3,220 passing, 2,068 rushing). The Jets also became the third team to win both Offensive Rookie of the Year and Defensive Rookie of the Year in the same season, with first-round picks Garrett Wilson and Sauce Gardner respectively achieving the awards.

Draft

Draft trades

Staff

Final roster

Preseason
The Jets' preseason opponents and schedule were announced on May 12.

Regular season

Schedule 

Note: Intra-division opponents are in bold text.

Game summaries

Week 1: vs. Baltimore Ravens

Lamar Jackson threw 3 touchdown passes for the Ravens and the Jets lost their fourth straight season opener.

Week 2: at Cleveland Browns

Nick Chubb scored a touchdown with 1:55 remaining in the fourth quarter and the Jets didn't have any timeouts. The Browns had a 99.7 percent chance of winning at that point. Two plays later Joe Flacco connected with a wide open Corey Davis to cut the lead to 6 points. The Jets recovered the onside kick and scored the game winning touchdown 9 plays later and won 31–30.

Garrett Wilson scored 2 touchdowns, including the game winner, in his NFL debut.

Week 3: vs. Cincinnati Bengals

Joe Burrow threw for 3 touchdowns as the Bengals won 27–12.

Week 4: at Pittsburgh Steelers

In Zach Wilson's return after a preseason meniscus injury, the Jets went up 10–0 on Pittsburgh, before falling behind 20–10 after Steelers quarterback Mitch Trubisky was benched for rookie Kenny Pickett; however, the Jets would mount two touchdown drives late in the fourth quarter, with Pickett throwing two interceptions, to take a 24–20 comeback victory.

This was the Jets' second-ever win in the state of Pennsylvania, having previously gone a combined 1–16 against the Steelers and Philadelphia Eagles.

Week 5: vs. Miami Dolphins

The Jets scored 40 points for the first time since Week 1 of 2018 and just the third time in the past decade, and snapped a 12-game losing streak against divisional opponents dating back to Week 17 of the 2019 season.

This win also marked the first time the Jets recorded a winning percentage over .500 since week 1 of 2018.

Week 6: at Green Bay Packers

This win marked the first time the Jets had defeated Aaron Rodgers (having previously been 0–3), and was their first victory over Green Bay since 2006.

Week 7: at Denver Broncos

Week 8: vs. New England Patriots

Week 9: vs. Buffalo Bills

Week 11: at New England Patriots

Week 12: vs. Chicago Bears

Week 13: at Minnesota Vikings

Week 14: at Buffalo Bills

Week 15: vs. Detroit Lions

Week 16: vs. Jacksonville Jaguars

Week 17: at Seattle Seahawks

Week 18: at Miami Dolphins

Standings

Division

Conference

References

External links
 

New York Jets
New York Jets seasons
New York Jets